The 1999 season of the astronomy TV show Jack Horkheimer: Star Gazer starring Jack Horkheimer started on January 4, 1999. The episode numbering scheme for the show changed again in this season. Episode numbering was restarted and incorporated the last two digits of the year, in this case "99" for the year 1999. The official Star Gazer website hosts the complete scripts for each of the shows.


1999 season

References

External links 
  Star Gazer official website
 

Jack Horkheimer: Star Gazer
1999 American television seasons